Uncial 0167 (in the Gregory-Aland numbering), is a Greek uncial manuscript of the New Testament, dated paleographically to the 7th century.

Description 

The codex contains a small part of the Gospel of Mark 4:24-29,37-41; 6:9-11,13-14,37-39,41,45, on 6 parchment leaves (28 cm by 25 cm). Leaves are in fragmentary condition. The text is written in two columns per page, 12 lines per page, in very large uncial letters. 

The Greek text of this codex is a representative of the Alexandrian text-type. Aland placed it in Category III. It means it has a lot of alien readings.

Currently it is dated by the INTF to the 7th century.

The codex was divided and currently is housed in two places. One of its parts is still housed at the Great Lavra (Δ' 61) in  Athos peninsula, the other is housed at the University of Louvain (Bibliothèque de l'Université, Sect. des Mss., frg. Omont no. 8) at Louvain.

It was described by Henri Omont (no. 8) and Kurt Treu.

See also 

 List of New Testament uncials
 Textual criticism

References

Further reading 

 Kurt Treu, Neutestamentliche Unzialfragmente in einer Athos-Handschrift 0167 Lavra, Δ' 61, ZNW 54 (Berlin: 1963), pp. 53-58. 

Greek New Testament uncials
7th-century biblical manuscripts
Athos manuscripts
Great Lavra